Washingtonville Central School District is a public school district in New York.

Schools
 Washingtonville High School
 Washingtonville Middle School
 Little Britain Elementary School
 Taft Elementary School
 Round Hill Elementary School

History
In 1931, Washingtonville became the second school district in Orange County, New York to centralize. Washingtonville Middle School was built on West Main Street between 1931 and 1933 and was originally called the "Washingtonville Central School." The Central School assembled children who had been attending one-room schoolhouses in Hamptonburgh, Blooming Grove and New Windsor under one roof.

The Washingtonville Central School building later became the high school building and, until the 1990s, served as Washingtonville Junior High School. Little Britain Elementary School used to belong to Stewart Air Force Base and was only for children of parents in the military. The base is still active today. The high school has undergone several renovations, the last completed in January 2007 and in addition to adding on classrooms, added on three computer labs including a Mac lab.

References

External links
 Official Website

School districts in New York (state)
Education in Orange County, New York
School districts established in 1931